The next Andhra Pradesh Legislative Assembly election is scheduled to be held in or before June 2024 to elect all 175 members of the state's legislative Assembly.

Background
The tenure of Andhra Pradesh Legislative Assembly is scheduled to end on 11 June 2024. The previous assembly elections were held in April 2019. After the election, YSR Congress Party formed the state government, Again election to be held in 2024.

Schedule

Parties and Alliances









On 14 February 2023, CPI(M) Polit Bureau member and ex-secretary of CPI(M) Andhra Pradesh state committee B. V. Raghavulu said that the party is willing to contest 25 to 30 seats in the upcoming election and the number of seats it would contest might vary after discussions with the CPI. He also added that his party will adopt a wait and watch policy on alliance for now and will ally with parties like Telugu Desam Party and Jana Sena Party if they clarify their intension and sincerity to defeat the BJP.

Others

See also
Elections in India

References

State Assembly elections in Andhra Pradesh
Andhra